Large-headed shrew may refer to:

Crocidura grandiceps
Paracrocidura (three species)

Animal common name disambiguation pages